Eruthempathy  is a village in the Palakkad district, state of Kerala, India. It forms a part of the Eruthampathy gram panchayat.

Demographics
 India census, Eruthenpathy had a population of 9,529 with 4,689 males and 4,840 females.

There are two rivers close by - the Korayar and Varattayar - but today they are dry due to deforestation and misuse of land. The Kerala Water Authority decided to help Eruthenpathy and neighboring villages with their water issues.

References

Eruthempathy